Giorgos Peppes (born 26 October 1961) is a Greek former professional footballer who played as center back.

Club career
Peppes started his football career at the academies of Ethnikos Piraeus, where in 1978 was promoted to the first team. After 3 seasons at the club he signed for Rodos for a season, only to return to Ethnikos in 1982 and play there for 3.5 seasons.

In December 1986 he transferred to AEK Athens. On 24 April 1988 he opened the score in a 2–2 draw against Panathinaikos. He also scored the equalizer with a header in the 1–2 home defeat against Olympiacos on 7 January 1989. At his 6-year spell at AEK, he won the 2 Championships, 1 Super Cup and 1 League Cup.

In the summer of 1992 he left AEK and returned to Ethnikos Piraeus for one season, before ending his career.

International career
Peppes played for Greece once in a friendly 0–0 draw against Cyprus, on 19 February 1986.

After football
After the end of his career, he created football academies in Marousi, while at the same time obtaining a coaching diploma and was involved in coaching at an amateur level. He also participates from time to time in events of AEK veterans.

Honours

AEK Athens 
Alpha Ethniki: 1988–89, 1991–92
Greek Super Cup: 1989
Greek League Cup: 1990

References

1961 births
Living people
Greek footballers
Super League Greece players
Ethnikos Piraeus F.C. players
Rodos F.C. players
AEK Athens F.C. players
Association football defenders
People from Eretria
Greece international footballers